Romiti is a surname of Italian origin. Notable people with the surname include:

 Cesare Romiti (1923–2020), Italian economist and businessman 
 Gino Romiti (1881–1967), Italian painter, active in Livorno

Surnames of Italian origin